HMS Avon, later renamed NRP Nuno Tristão, was a  of the Royal Navy (RN). Avon was built to the RN's specifications as a Group II River-class frigate. She served in the North Atlantic during World War II.

As a River-class frigate, Avon was one of 151 frigates launched between 1941 and 1944 for use as anti-submarine convoy escorts, named after rivers in the United Kingdom. The ships were designed by naval engineer William Reed, of Smith's Dock Company of South Bank-on-Tees, to have the endurance and anti-submarine capabilities of the  sloops, while being quick and cheap to build in civil dockyards using the machinery (e.g. reciprocating steam engines instead of turbines) and construction techniques pioneered in the building of the s. Its purpose was to improve on the convoy escort classes in service with the Royal Navy at the time, including the Flower class.

After her commission, Avon was deployed in the Indian Ocean, where she rescued the survivors of the sunken Norwegian freighter Tarifa. In 1945, she took part in the Battle of Okinawa, where she came under air attack. Postwar, Avon was paid off and placed in the Reserve Fleet, where she stayed until 1949. That year, she was sold to Portugal and renamed NRP Nuno Tristão.

The Nuno Tristão was used in several notable events, such as carrying Emperor Haile Selassie of Ethiopia on a state visit from Bayonne to Portugal in July 1959 and supporting fuzileiros in Africa. In 1970, after 21 years of service in the Portuguese Navy, the ship was delisted; it was scrapped in Lisbon two years later.

Notes

Citations

References
 
 

 

1943 ships
River-class frigates of the Royal Navy
World War II frigates of the United Kingdom